Heidegger and the Place of Ethics: Being-with in the Crossing of Heidegger's Thought is a 2005 book by British philosopher Michael Lewis in which the author examines Heideggerian ethics with a focus on the concept being-with and revisits the relationship between ethics and politics in Heidegger's thought which can be seen in his engagement with Nazism.

References

External links 
 Heidegger and the Place of Ethics: Being-with in the Crossing of Heidegger's Thought

2005 non-fiction books
Continental philosophy literature
Works about Martin Heidegger
Ethics books
Theses
Books in political philosophy
Bloomsbury Publishing books